The Octagon is a business and retail center in the heart of Accra, the capital of Ghana. The building complex offers ca. 75,000 m2 usable area for luxury offices and retail inclusively a five-star hotel. Opened in 2013, it is located in Tudu a suburb of Accra on an area closed by the Independence Avenue and the Barnes Road, northern of the Kinbu Gardens.

References

Buildings and structures in Accra